Vladimir Antakov (13 July 1957 – 16 August 2011) was a Soviet field hockey player. He competed at the 1988 Summer Olympics and the 1992 Summer Olympics.

References

External links
 

1957 births
2011 deaths
Soviet male field hockey players
Olympic field hockey players of the Soviet Union
Olympic field hockey players of the Unified Team
Field hockey players at the 1988 Summer Olympics
Field hockey players at the 1992 Summer Olympics
People from Polevskoy
Sportspeople from Sverdlovsk Oblast